Sodium phenylbutyrate/ursodoxicoltaurine, also known as sodium phenylbutyrate/taurursodiol and sold under the brand name Albrioza among others, is a fixed-dose combination medication used for the treatment of amyotrophic lateral sclerosis (ALS). It contains sodium phenylbutyrate and ursodoxicoltaurine (taurursodiol).

The most common adverse reactions experienced with sodium phenylbutyrate/ursodoxicoltaurine include diarrhea, abdominal pain, nausea and upper respiratory tract infection.

Sodium phenylbutyrate/ursodoxicoltaurine acts by blocking cell death pathways in mitochondria and in the endoplasmic reticulum. Sodium phenylbutyrate is a chemical chaperone that helps proteins maintain their normal conformation, preventing aggregation that may lead to cell death. Ursodoxicoltaurine improves mitochondrial energy production.

The combination was approved for medical use in Canada as Albrioza, in June 2022, and in the United States, as Relyvrio, in September 2022.

Medical uses 
Sodium phenylbutyrate/ursodoxicoltaurine is indicated for the treatment of amyotrophic lateral sclerosis (ALS).

History 
In a phase II/III clinical trial, CENTAUR, for ALS sodium phenylbutyrate/ursodoxicoltaurine (AMX0035) showed increased survival times.

A phase II trial for Alzheimer's disease, PEGASUS, confirmed the safety and tolerability of sodium phenylbutyrate/ursodoxicoltaurine.

The efficacy of sodium phenylbutyrate/ursodoxicoltaurine for the treatment of ALS was demonstrated in a 24-week, multi-center, randomized, double-blind, placebo-controlled, parallel-group study. In the trial, 137 adult participants with ALS were randomized to receive either sodium phenylbutyrate/ursodoxicoltaurine or placebo. The participants treated with sodium phenylbutyrate/ursodoxicoltaurine experienced a slower rate of decline on a clinical assessment of daily functioning compared to those receiving a placebo. Additionally, longer overall survival was observed in a post hoc, long-term analysis of participants who originally received sodium phenylbutyrate/ursodoxicoltaurine versus those who originally received placebo.

The US Food and Drug Administration (FDA) granted the application for the combination priority review and orphan drug designations. The FDA granted the approval of Relyvrio to Amylyx Pharmaceuticals Inc.

Society and culture 
In the United States, healthcare insurer Cigna decided in early 2023 to reverse it's original decision to cover the cost of the drug for all ALS patients, opting instead to cover "patients who meet certain clinical criteria", arguing that the drug is "experimental, investigational or unproven".

Controversies 
The FDA approval is controversial because of the small size of the trial. The FDA Peripheral and Central Nervous System Drugs Advisory Committee voted not to recommend approval, and then in an unusual second vote recommended approval.

Research 
It is being studied as a treatment for Alzheimer's disease and Wolfram syndrome.

References

External links 
 
 

Drugs acting on the nervous system
Combination drugs
Orphan drugs